Sonja Peters (born 25 October 1976) is a Dutch wheelchair tennis player. She represented the Netherlands at the 2000 Summer Paralympics and at the 2004 Summer Paralympics. She won the silver medal in the women's singles event at the 2004 Summer Paralympics.

References

External links 
 

1976 births
Living people
Place of birth missing (living people)
Dutch female tennis players
Wheelchair tennis players
Paralympic wheelchair tennis players of the Netherlands
Paralympic silver medalists for the Netherlands
Paralympic medalists in wheelchair tennis
Medalists at the 2004 Summer Paralympics
Wheelchair tennis players at the 2000 Summer Paralympics
Wheelchair tennis players at the 2004 Summer Paralympics
20th-century Dutch women
21st-century Dutch women